Arthur Rinderknech was the defending champion but lost in the semifinals to Benjamin Bonzi.

Bonzi won the title after defeating Mats Moraing 7–6(7–3), 7–6(7–3) in the final.

Seeds

Draw

Finals

Top half

Bottom half

References

External links
Main draw
Qualifying draw

Open de Rennes - 1
2021 Singles